Nordkehdingen is a Samtgemeinde ("collective municipality") on the left bank of the Elbe, north west of Hamburg (Germany). Nordkehdingen has a population of 7,732 and belongs to the district of Stade, Lower Saxony. The seat of the municipality is in Freiburg.

The Samtgemeinde Nordkehdingen consists of the following municipalities:

Balje 
Freiburg
Krummendeich 
Oederquart 
Wischhafen

External links 
 Homepage of collective municipality Nordkehdingen

Samtgemeinden in Lower Saxony